Et spøkelse forelsker seg (A Ghost Falls in Love) is a Norwegian adventure film and spoof comedy from 1946. The film was directed by Tancred Ibsen, who also wrote the screenplay.>

Plot
At the Krogeby estate, which is owned by the Vinkelkrog family, there are four ghosts. Per Aabel plays Johnny Vinkelkrog, who visits his aunt Clementine. He happens to look exactly like one of the ghosts, and intrigue ensues when the two are mistaken.

Cast

Per Aabel as Johnny Vinkelkrog / a ghost	
Guri Stormoen as Aunt Clementine
Wenche Foss as Irene, alias Barbara Burns
Joachim Holst-Jensen as a ghost
Carsten Winger as a ghost
Andreas Aabel as Fidias
Arne Thomas Olsen as a servant
Folkman Schaanning as the admiral
Arvid Nilssen as a servant
Georg Richter as Lars
Jon Lennart Mjøen as Lauritz
Brita Bigum as Grynet
Anne-Lise Wang as Tyttebæret
Esther Bretonnez (Cocca) Marstrander as Vivi	
Kari Diesen as the maid at the hotel
Ernst Diesen as the floor attendant at the hotel
Ragna Breda
 Humlens Danseorkester

References

External links
 
 Et spøkelse forelsker seg at Filmfront
 Et spøkelse forelsker seg at the National Library of Norway

1946 films
Norwegian comedy films
Norwegian black-and-white films
1940s Norwegian-language films
Films directed by Tancred Ibsen